Gangtok Assembly constituency is one of the 32 assembly constituencies of Sikkim a north east state of India. Gangtok is part of Sikkim Lok Sabha constituency. This Constituency is Scheduled Tribe (ST: Bhutia, Lepcha and Sherpa) constituency from 2009.

Members of Legislative Assembly
 1979: Lal Bahadur Basnet, Sikkim Janata Parishad
 1985: Balchand Sarda, Independent
 1989: Manita Pradhan, Sikkim Sangram Parishad
 1994: Narendra Kumar Pradhan, Sikkim Sangram Parishad
 1999: Narendra Kumar Pradhan, SSikkim Sangram Parishad
 2004: Narendra Kumar Pradhan, Sikkim Democratic Front
 2009: Dorjee Namgyal Bhutia, Sikkim Democratic Front
 2014: Pintso Chopel, Sikkim Krantikari Morcha

Electoral results

2019 By-Election
In the 2019 Sikkim Legislative Assembly election, Kunga Nima Lepcha of SKM won in both Shyari and Gangtok constituencies, so he relinquished Gangtok seat. 

In the by-election, ruling SKM didn't send their candidate to Gangtok, and supported opposition BJP. Former ruling SDF participated in the Sikkim Legislative Assembly election as the opposition for the first time in 25 years. Opposition SNPP and SRP sent their candidates to Gangtok for the first time. Opposition INC boycotted this by-election.

As the result, Yong Tshering Lepcha of BJP defeated his nearest rival Delay Namgyal Barfungpa of SNPP. Rinzing Ongmu Bhutia of SDF fell to the 3rd position.

2019
Incumbent Member of Sikkim Legislative Assembly from opposition SKM, Pintso Chopel moved to ruling SDF. Opposition HSP sent its candidate to Gangtok for the first time. Opposition INC didn't send its candidate to Gangtok, and AITC didn't participate in this election.

Kunga Nima Lepcha of SKM defeated his nearest rival Pintso Chopel of SDF.

2014
Opposition SKM, BJP and AITC sent their candidates to Gangtok for the first time. SGPP didn't participate in this election. SHRP had already been merged by INC (SPCC) in 2013.

Pintso Chopel of SKM defeated his nearest rival Hishey Lachungpa of ruling SDF.

2009
From this year, Gangtok constituency became Scheduled Tribe constituency. Opposition SGPP sent its candidate to Gangtok for the first time. Opposition SSP didn't participate in this election.

Dorjee Namgyal Bhutia of ruling SDF defeated his nearest rival Tshering Gyatso Kaleon of opposition INC.

2004
Incumbent Member of Sikkim Legislative Assembly from opposition SSP, Narendra Kumar Pradhan moved to ruling SDF. Opposition INC sent SPCC president and former Chief Minister Nar Bahadur Bhandari to Gangtok. Opposition Sikkim Himali Rajya Parishad sent its candidate to Gangtok for the first time. 

Narendra Kumar Pradhan of SDF defeated his nearest rival Nar Bahadur Bhandari of INC.

See also

 Gangtok
 South Sikkim district
 List of constituencies of Sikkim Legislative Assembly

References

Assembly constituencies of Sikkim
Gangtok district
Gangtok